Congea chinensis is a plant in the family Lamiaceae.  In Chinese, it is known as 华绒苞藤 (Pinyin: hua rong bao teng).

It is native to south Yunnan and Myanmar, and is found in mixed forests at 700 to 1500 meter above sea level.

Botanical description
Branchlets densely grayish pilose. Petiole to 7 mm, pilose; leaf blade narrowly elliptic, 8–14.5 X ca. 5 cm, abaxially densely pilose, base subrounded to cordate, margin entire, apex acuminate; veins abaxially prominent, pilose when young. Cymes 5-7-flowered, densely grayish pilose; peduncle 1–2 cm; involucral bracts 4, narrowly oblong, 2.5-3 X 0.5-0.8 cm. Calyx campanulate, 7–8 mm, outside densely white pilose, inside pubescent. Corolla grayish, ca. 7 mm, tube cylindric. Stamens 4, long exserted. Ovary ca. 2 mm, glabrous. Fl. Oct.

External links
 Congea chinensis in Flora of China @ efloras.org

Lamiaceae
Flora of Yunnan
Flora of Myanmar
Plants described in 1947
Lamiales of Asia